Mark Clark (June 28, 1947 – December 4, 1969) was an American activist and member of the Black Panther Party (BPP). He was killed on December 4, 1969 with Fred Hampton, state chairman of the Black Panthers, during a Chicago police predawn raid.

In January 1970, a coroner's jury held an inquest and ruled the deaths of Clark and Hampton to be justifiable homicide. Survivors and the relatives of Clark and Hampton filed a wrongful death lawsuit  against the City of Chicago, Cook County, and the federal government (specifically FBI). It was settled in November 1982, with each entity paying $616,333 to a group of nine plaintiffs.

Youth
Clark was born on June 28, 1947, in Peoria, Illinois, to Elder William Clark and Fannie (Bardley) Clark. He became active in the National Association for the Advancement of Colored People (NAACP) at an early age and joined in demonstrating against discrimination in employment, housing, and education. According to John Gwynn, former president of state and local chapters of the NAACP, Clark and his brothers played a role in helping keep other teenagers in line. "He could call for order when older persons or adults could not", Gwynn said of Clark in a December 1969 interview with the Chicago Tribune. In that same Chicago Tribune article, family members are quoted as saying Clark enjoyed reading and art, and was good at drawing portraits. He attended Manual High School and Illinois Central College in East Peoria .

Black Panther Party
After reading their literature and the Ten Point Program, Clark joined the Black Panther Party and later decided to organize a local Peoria chapter. He went from church to church in an effort to find a building to house a free breakfast program. He was eventually successful when Pastor Blaine Ramsey agreed to allow a free breakfast program. Church members later voted against continuing the breakfast program because of concerns of government monitoring of the Black Panther Party.  It was later revealed that the U.S. Federal Bureau of Investigation (FBI) was at that time running a massive and largely illegal disruption and neutralization campaign against the Panthers as an organization and against individual members, sympathizers and supporters of the BPP as part of the FBI's Counterintelligence Program (COINTELPRO), in close collaboration with state and local police throughout the USA.

Death
Some family members and friends say Mark Clark knew he would be murdered in Chicago. In the predawn hours of December 4, 1969, Chicago Police stormed into the apartment of BPP State Chairman Fred Hampton at 2337 West Monroe Street, killing both Mark Clark (age 22) and Fred Hampton (age 21), and causing serious bodily harm to Verlina Brewer, Ronald "Doc" Satchel, Blair Anderson, and Brenda Harris.

Hampton and Deborah Johnson, who was eight-and-a-half months pregnant with their child, were sleeping in the south bedroom. Satchel, Anderson, and Brewer were asleep in the north bedroom. Harris and Louis Truelock were sleeping on a bed by the south wall of the living room, and Harold Bell slept on a mattress on the floor in the middle of the room. Clark, sitting in the front room of the apartment with a shotgun in his lap, was on security duty.

The first shot hit Clark in the heart. He died instantly, and his gun went off as he fell, according to Harris, who watched from the bed in the corner.

The single round was later determined to be caused by a reflexive death convulsion after the raiding team shot him. This was the only shot the Panthers fired. A federal grand jury determined that the police fired between 82 and 99 shots, including into bedrooms, while most of the occupants lay sleeping.

Inquest
Shortly afterwards, Cook County Coroner Andrew Toman began forming a special six-member coroner's jury to hold an inquest into the deaths of Clark and Hampton. On December 23, Toman announced four additions to the jury which included two African-American men: physician Theodore K. Lawless and attorney Julian B. Wilkins, the son of J. Ernest Wilkins Sr. He stated the four were selected from a group of candidates submitted to his office by groups and individuals representing both Chicago's black and white communities. Civil rights leaders and spokesmen for the black community were reported to have been disappointed with the selection. An official with the Chicago Urban League said: "I would have had more confidence in the jury if one of them had been a black man who has a rapport with the young and the grass roots in the community." Gus Savage said that such a man to whom the community could relate need not be black. The jury eventually included a third black man who was a member of the first coroner's jury sworn in on December 4.

The blue-ribbon panel convened for the inquest on January 6, 1970 and on January 21 ruled the deaths of Clark and Hampton to be justifiable homicide. The jury qualified their verdict on the death of Hampton as "based solely and exclusively on the evidence presented to this inquisition"; police and expert witness provided the only testimony during the inquest. Jury foreman James T. Hicks stated that they could not consider the charges of the Black Panthers in the apartment who stated that the police entered the apartment shooting; those who survived the raid were reported to have refused to testify during the inquest because they faced criminal charges of attempted murder and aggravated assault during the raid. Attorneys for the Clark and Hampton families did not introduce any witnesses during the proceedings, but described the inquest as "a well-rehearsed theatrical performance designed to vindicate the police officers". State's Attorney Edward Hanrahan said the verdict was recognition "of the truthfulness of our police officers' account of the events".

Civil rights lawsuit
In 1970, a $47.7 million lawsuit was filed on behalf of the survivors and the relatives of Clark and Hampton stating that the civil rights of the Black Panther members were violated. Twenty-eight defendants were named, including Hanrahan as well as the City of Chicago, Cook County, and federal governments. The following trial lasted 18 months and was reported to have been the longest federal trial up to that time. After its conclusion in 1977, Judge Joseph Sam Perry of United States District Court for the Northern District of Illinois dismissed the suit against 21 of the defendants prior to jury deliberations. Perry dismissed the suit against the remaining defendants after jurors deadlocked. In 1979, the United States Court of Appeals for the Seventh Circuit in Chicago stated that the government had withheld relevant documents thereby obstructing the judicial process. Reinstating the case against 24 of the defendants, the Court of Appeals ordered a new trial. The Supreme Court of the United States heard an appeal but voted 5–3 in 1980 to return the case to the District Court for a new trial.

In 1982, the City of Chicago, Cook County, and the federal government agreed to a settlement in which each would pay $616,333 to a group of nine plaintiffs, including the mothers of Clark and Hampton. The $1.85 million settlement was believed to be the largest ever in a civil rights case.

Controversy
Ten days after the murders of Hampton and Clark, Bobby Rush, then the "minister of defense" for the Illinois Black Panther party, called the raiding party an "execution squad". Despite the settlements, controversy remained as to whether the men died in an exchange of gunfire with police or were intentionally slain.

Weather Underground reaction
In response to the killing of Black Panther members Fred Hampton and Mark Clark during the December 1969 police raid, on May 21, 1970, the Weather Underground issued a "Declaration of War" against the United States government, using for the first time its new name, the "Weather Underground Organization" (WUO), adopting fake identities, and pursuing covert activities only. These initially included preparations for a bombing of a U.S. military non-commissioned officers' dance at Fort Dix, New Jersey, in what Brian Flanagan said had been intended to be "the most horrific hit the United States government had ever suffered on its territory".

Although two months earlier, Hampton had criticized the predominantly white Weather Underground (also known as the Weathermen) for being "adventuristic, masochistic and Custeristic", Bernardine Dohrn of the Weathermen, which had a close relationship with the Black Panthers in Chicago at the time of Hampton's death, said in the documentary The Weather Underground (2002) that the killing of Fred Hampton caused them to "be more grave, more serious, more determined to raise the stakes, and not just be the white people who wrung their hands when black people were being murdered."

References

External links
 Remember Mark Clark
 The Mark Clark Memorial Foundation, Inc.
 Mark Clark: "Quiet Leader" 
 Mark Clark Legacy MySpace Edition
 Fallout continues more than four decades after cops kill Black Panthers Mark Clark and Fred Hampton during infamous Chicago raid.
    Podcast talk with writer Lawrence Maushard about Mark Clark
 Black Panther Mark Clark and Comrades Deserve Apology From His Hometown Newspaper Peoria Journal Star. After 46 Years, Their Lives Still Matter.

1947 births
1969 deaths
1969 crimes in the United States
Members of the Black Panther Party
People from Peoria, Illinois
Activists from Chicago
COINTELPRO targets
Deaths by firearm in Illinois
Chicago Police Department
African Americans shot dead by law enforcement officers in the United States
Illinois Central College alumni